Universiada Hall is an Indoor arena in Sofia, Bulgaria. Opened in 1961 for the II Summer Universiade, the arena has a seating capacity for 4,000 people and is the regular home venue of the Levski Sofia basketball team.

References

External links 
Official site 

Indoor arenas in Bulgaria
Basketball venues in Bulgaria
Sports venues in Sofia
Sports venues completed in 1961
1961 establishments in Bulgaria